In modern Japanese folklore since the mid-2000s, the Ningen (ニンゲン) is an aquatic humanoid whale-like creature supposedly inhabiting the subantarctic oceans. It was invented by Japanese internet users.

History 
The legend surrounding the Ningen began in 2002 on a forum post on the Japanese online forum website, 2Channel, which claims that the members of a whale research ship witnessed the creature as it surfaced near their ship off the Antarctic coast. Originally thinking it was a submarine, the crew went to take a closer look, but the "submarine" vanished into the waves. 

In 2005, Google Earth captured what many people supposed to be a Ningen near the Southern Ocean. Many skeptics believe that the "Ningen" was actually an iceberg that coincidentally looked like the sea monster.

In 2010, a Japanese chemical research company published a YouTube video showing the ocean life that they observed. Near the end of the video, a large creature with small eyes and a large, smiling slit-like mouth can be spotted lying on the ocean floor. Though most people think that the infamous Ningen was spotted , some people say that it is most likely a snaggle-toothed snake eel. Sometime around the 2010s, an unknown user posted underwater footage depicting a large humanoid sea creature which many believe to be the Ningen.

Description  
The Ningen is described as a whale-like creature that has anatomical similarities to humans. The pigmentation of this creature is said to be pale blue. The creature has a large, slit-like mouth and either small or large gaping eyes.

See also 
 List of legendary creatures from Japan

References 

Fictional whales
Legendary mammals
Water spirits